South Sulawesi campaign or South Sulawesi expedition may refer to:

South Sulawesi expeditions of 1905, by the Dutch colonial government against the kingdoms of Bone and Gowa
South Sulawesi campaign of 1946–1947, by the Dutch colonial government against Indonesian republicans

See also
Dutch–Bone wars